László Menyhárth (30 May 1849 – 16 November 1897 in Boroma, South Africa) was a Hungarian missionary and botanical collector.

He studied theology and philosophy in Innsbruck, later serving as a gymnasium teacher in Kalocsa. Here he conducted investigations of the local flora. From around 1890, he worked as a missionary in southern Africa, from where he also performed meteorological observations and collected botanical specimens. Plants collected in Africa were sent to Swiss botanist Hans Schinz for further examination.

Published works 
 Kolocsa vidékének növénytenyészete, 1877 – Botany of the Kolocsa environs. 
 Meteorologische Beobachtungen, angestellt zu Boroma in Süd-Afrika im Jahre 1891 und 1892 (with Julius Fényi), 1896 – Meteorological observations, from Boroma, South Africa 1891/1892.
 Meteorologische Beobachtungen zu Boroma und Zumbo in Südafrika in den Jahren 1893–1897 (with Julius Fényi), 1905 – Meteorological observations, from Boroma and Zumbo, South Africa 1893–97.
 Plantae Menyharthianae : ein Beitrag zur Kenntnis der Flora des unteren Sambesi (with Hans Schinz), 1905 – "Plantae Menyhartianae", a contribution to the knowledge of flora of the lower Zambezi area.

References 

1849 births
1897 deaths
19th-century Hungarian botanists
Hungarian Christian missionaries
Christian missionaries in South Africa
Hungarian expatriates in South Africa
Missionary botanists